Joseph Henry Ward (born 22 August 1995) is an English professional footballer who plays as a winger for League One side Peterborough United.

Club career

Chelmsford City
After initially featuring for the Chelmsford City youth sides whilst on a BTEC scholarship scheme, Ward made his debut for the club during their 6–0 home victory over Farnborough in the 2012–13 campaign at the age of 16. On 30 November 2013, Ward scored on his first start for Chelmsford City, once again against Farnborough, in a 3–1 win. On 23 April 2014, Ward scored the goal to save Chelmsford City from relegation from the Conference South in a 1–0 win over Gosport Borough. In his final campaign at Chelmsford, Ward netted eleven times, including six goals during their impressive FA Cup run, in which they reached the fourth qualifying round before being knocked out by Barnet.

In 2013 he spent time on loan with Stanway Rovers, making six league appearances.

Brighton & Hove Albion
Following trials with both West Ham United and Brighton & Hove Albion in summer 2015, Brighton & Hove Albion signed Ward on a development contract on 3 June 2015.

After failing to break through into the first-team squad, Ward was sent out on loan to National League side Lincoln City on a one-month basis in January 2017. A day later, he made his debut during Lincoln's FA Trophy second-round victory over Gateshead, playing the entire 90 minutes in the 3–1 triumph. In the following round, Ward netted twice during Lincoln's 3–1 away victory against Welling United. Six days later, Ward's loan spell was extended for a further two months following some impressive form, especially in their FA Trophy campaign.

Woking
On 21 June 2017, Ward signed for National League club Woking on a two-year deal following his release from Brighton & Hove Albion.

On the opening day of the 2017–18 campaign, Ward netted in Woking's 2–1 home victory over Gateshead, sealing the winner in the 44th minute. Ward went onto net five more times during their league campaign, including goals against Torquay United, Macclesfield Town, Maidstone United, AFC Fylde and Dover Athletic. Following this impressive form, Ward received his first call-up to the England C squad, in which he featured for 45 minutes during their 4–0 International Challenge Trophy final defeat against Slovakia U23s. During Woking's impressive FA Cup run, Ward netted the Cards' equaliser in their second round tie against League One side Peterborough United.

Peterborough United
On 10 January 2018, Ward joined League One side Peterborough United following his impressive performances against them, on a two-and-a-half-year deal for an undisclosed fee. Three days later, Ward made his debut for Peterborough, as well as his Football League debut, in a 0–0 draw with Wigan Athletic, replacing Michael Doughty in the 68th minute. Following an impressive 2020–21 season, Ward was named in the 2020–21 EFL League One Team of the Season at the league's annual awards ceremony.

Career statistics

Honours
Individual
EFL League One Team of the Season: 2020–21

References

External links

1995 births
Living people
Sportspeople from Chelmsford
English footballers
Association football wingers
Chelmsford City F.C. players
Stanway Rovers F.C. players
Brighton & Hove Albion F.C. players
Lincoln City F.C. players
Woking F.C. players
Peterborough United F.C. players
National League (English football) players
English Football League players
England semi-pro international footballers